A nanoflower, in chemistry, refers to a compound of certain elements that results in formations which in microscopic view resemble flowers or, in some cases, trees that are called nanobouquets or  nanotrees. These formations are nanometers long and thick so they can only be observed using electron microscopy.

Production
Several ways to produce nanoflowers are known: 
 A process similar to the making of a carbon nanotube using a hydrocarbon gas. 
 Heating gallium (Ga) and then flowing methane (CH4) over, under specific pressure and heat. This forms flower-shaped silicon carbide (SiC) structures. 
 Heating a molybdenum dioxide (MoO2) thin film on a piece of molybdenum foil surrounded by sulfur vapour.

Nanomeadow 
In supercapacitors, energy is stored because the electrodes are coated with a porous material that soaks up ions like a sponge, usually activated carbon. Nanomeadow supercapacitors store ions in manganese oxide (MnO), a material with a much greater capacity for ions than activated carbon.

Scientists at Research Institute of Chemical Defence (Beijing, China) and Peking University created a nanomeadow of microscopic structures, fuzzy flowers of MnO each about 100 nanometres across on a field of messy carbon nanotube grass grown on a tantalum metal foil. Nanomeadows perform 10 times better than MnO alone and can store twice as much charge as the carbon-based electrodes in existing ultracapacitors.

See also

Footnotes

References

Summary of the 2nd E.E.F. (Enosi Ellinon Fysikon, Hellenic Science Society) Conference in Texnopolis Athens, Greece

External links

Photo of nanoflower

Nanoparticles by morphology